Vidmantas Plečkaitis (born 17 February 1957 in Klaipėda, Lithuanian SSR) is a Lithuanian painter, artist, public figure and politician, former vice mayor of city of Klaipėda.

Biography 
1983, the graduated from the Kaunas Polytechnic Institute, a mechanical engineer.
1997, director of R. Suslavičius food company Klaipeda's branch. 2000-2003 and 2003–2007, the Klaipeda City deputy mayor. From 2007 Klaipeda municipal council secretary.
1993 - member of Liberal Union of Lithuania. 2003 Liberal and Center Union Klaipeda department member, Vice-Chairman. 2006 the Chairman of the Department of Klaipeda Liberal and Center Union.

References

Lithuanian painters
Politicians from Klaipėda
1957 births
Living people
Liberal Union of Lithuania politicians
Liberal and Centre Union politicians
Kaunas University of Technology alumni